is an artistic technique for creating Japanese pottery in multiple colors of clay. The technique is also called , although this term also refers to the throwing of multiple colored clays on a wheel.

History
 is a contemporary Japanese term. Marbling ceramic techniques were used in Egypt and China and through the Romans to the West. Early ceramics in Stoke-on-Trent use more than one colour of clay for decorative effect. In England this was referred to as agateware.

The term started being used in the 1970s to describe related kanji neriage. Yusuke Aida was on a television commercial for Nescafé and it seems to have entered the vocabulary at about that time when his nerikomi coffee cups were available to the first people contacting the advertisers.

It was used in the Tang Dynasty in 7th century China there are at least two Chinese characters to describe variations of this technique (one surface, one structural).

Technique
In , a design is created in such a way that it extends through a long block of clay, akin to the murrine canes of millefiori glasswork. By slicing thin slabs of the block, the design can be repeated, to either be reassembled in repetition or applied to a larger piece.

See also
 Japanese pottery

References

External links

http://nerikomi.blogspot.com  in Japanese
http://www.yusukeaida.co.jp/

Artistic techniques
Japanese art terminology
Japanese pottery
Japanese words and phrases